The 2007 All-Big 12 Conference football team consists of American football players chosen as All-Big 12 Conference players for the 2007 Big 12 Conference football season.  The conference recognizes two official All-Big 12 selectors: (1) the Big 12 conference coaches selected separate offensive and defensive units and named first- and second-team players (the "Coaches" team); and (2) a panel of sports writers and broadcasters covering the Big 12 also selected offensive and defensive units and named first- and second-team players (the "Media" team).

Offensive selections

Quarterbacks

 Chase Daniel, Missouri (Coaches-1; Media-1)
 Todd Reesing, Kansas (Coaches-2; Media-2)

Running backs
 Jamaal Charles, Texas (Coaches-1; Media-1)
 Dantrell Savage, Oklahoma State (Coaches-1; Media-1)
 Brandon McAnderson, Kansas (Coaches-2; Media-2)
 James Johnson, Kansas State (Media-2)
 Marlon Lucky, Nebraska (Coaches-2)

Centers

 Adam Spieker, Missouri (Coaches-1; Media-1)

Guards

Tackles

Tight ends

 Martin Rucker, Missouri (Coaches-2; Media-1)
 Chase Coffman, Missouri (Media-2)
 Brandon Pettigrew, Oklahoma State (Coaches-1)

Receivers
 Michael Crabtree, Texas Tech (Coaches-1; Media-1)
 Jordy Nelson, Kansas State (Coaches-1; Media-1)
 Jeremy Maclin, Missouri (Coaches-1)
 Adarius Bowman, Oklahoma State (Coaches-2; Media-2)
 Marcus Henry, Kansas (Coaches-2; Media-2)
 Malcolm Kelly, Oklahoma (Coaches-2)

Defensive selections

Defensive linemen

 Auston English, Oklahoma (Coaches-1; Media-1)
 George Hypolite, Colorado (Coaches-1; Media-1)
 James McClinton, Kansas (Coaches-1; Media-1)
 Lorenzo Williams, Missouri (Coaches-1; Media-1)
 Ian Campbell, Kansas State (Coaches-1)
 Nathan Peterson, Oklahoma State (Coaches-2; Media-2)
 Frank Okam, Texas (Coaches-2; Media-2)
 Demarcus Granger, Oklahoma (Coaches-2)
 Chris Harrington, Texas A&M (Coaches-2)
 Derek Lokey, Texas (Coaches-2)
 Stryker Sulak, Missouri (Coaches-2; Media-2)
 Brandon Williams, Texas Tech (Media-2)

Linebackers

 Jordon Dizon, Colorado (Coaches-1; Media-1)
 Curtis Lofton, Oklahoma (Coaches-1; Media-1)
 Joe Mortensen, Kansas (Coaches-1; Media-1)
 Sean Weatherspoon, Missouri (Coaches-2; Media-1)
 Alvin Bowen, Iowa State (Coaches-2; Media-2)
 Ian Campbell, Kansas State (Media-2)
 Mark Dodge, Texas A&M (Media-2)
 Joe Pawelek, Baylor (Media-2)
 Misi Tupe, Texas A&M (Coaches-2)

Defensive backs

 Reggie Smith, Oklahoma (Coaches-1; Media-1)
 Aqib Talib, Kansas (Coaches-1; Media-1)
 Terrence Wheatley, Colorado (Coaches-1; Media-1)
 Nic Harris, Oklahoma (Coaches-1; Media-2)
 Marcus Griffin, Texas (Coaches-1)
 William Moore, Missouri (Coaches-2; Media-1)
 Cornelius Brown, Missouri (Coaches-2; Media-2)
 Jordan Lake, Baylor(Coaches-2; Media-2)
 D.J. Wolfe, Oklahoma (Coaches-2; Media-2)
 Justin McKinney, Kansas State (Media-2)
 Brandon Foster, Texas (Media-2)

Special teams

Kickers

 Jeff Wolfert, Missouri (Coaches-2; Media-1)
 Alex Trlica, Texas Tech (Coaches-1)
 Garrett Hartley, Oklahoma (Coaches-2)
 Brooks Rossman, Kansas State (Media-2)

Punters

 Tim Reyer, Kansas State (Coaches-1; Media-1)
 Justin Brantly, Texas A&M (Coaches-2)
 Matt Fodge, Oklahoma State (Media-2)

All-purpose / Return specialists

 Jeremy Maclin, Missouri (Coaches-1; Media-1)
 Marcus Herford, Kansas (Coaches-2)
 Quan Cosby, Texas (Media-2)

Key
Bold = selected as a first-team player by both the coaches and media panel

Coaches = selected by Big 12 Conference coaches

Media = selected by a media panel

See also
2007 College Football All-America Team

References

All-Big 12 Conference
All-Big 12 Conference football teams